Tatyana (Tatiana) Sudarikova (born May 28, 1973) is a female  javelin thrower from Russia, who competed for Kyrgyzstan  at the 2000 Summer Olympics in Sydney, Australia. She set her personal best (62.48 metres) in 1993 in Dzerzhinsk. Following from the Olympics she married and moved to Sydney, where she currently resides. Sudarikova is an active participant in Masters Athletics. She is the current Australian W35 record holder for 56LB (4.30m) and 100LB (2.22m) weight throw.

Competition record

References

External links
 
 sports-reference
 www.australianmastersathletics.org.au/ama-records/

1973 births
Living people
Kyrgyzstani javelin throwers
Athletes (track and field) at the 2000 Summer Olympics
Olympic athletes of Kyrgyzstan
Female javelin throwers
Kyrgyzstani female athletes
Kyrgyzstani people of Russian descent